Parmouti 29 - Coptic Calendar - Pashons 1

The thirtieth day of the Coptic month of Parmouti, the eighth month of the Coptic year. In common years, this day corresponds to April 25, of the Julian Calendar, and May 8, of the Gregorian Calendar. This day falls in the Coptic Season of Shemu, the season of the Harvest.

Commemorations

Apostles 

 The martyrdom of Saint Mark, the Evangelist of the Land of Egypt

References 

Days of the Coptic calendar